Snorri Einarsson (born 21 February 1986) is an Icelandic cross-country skier born in Norway. His father is Icelandic, and his mother is Norwegian; he now competes for that nation. He now lives in Isafjörður, Iceland with his girlfriend and four children. He competed for Iceland at the 2018 Winter Olympics. Einarsson has participated in the Tour de Ski representing both Norway and Iceland. His 18th place in the 50km in the Seefeld World Championships makes him the most accomplished cross-country skier in Iceland ever.

In Norway he represented the club Tromsø SK.

Cross-country skiing results
All results are sourced from the International Ski Federation (FIS).

Olympic Games

Distance reduced to 30 km due to weather conditions.

World Championships

World Cup

Season standings

References 

1986 births
Living people
Norwegian male cross-country skiers
Cross-country skiers at the 2018 Winter Olympics
Cross-country skiers at the 2022 Winter Olympics
Snorri Einarsson
Snorri Einarsson
Tour de Ski skiers
Norwegian people of Icelandic descent
Icelandic people of Norwegian descent
Sportspeople from Tromsø